Quad God is a 2000 film made by Tritin Films. It was created using the machinima technique of recording video frames from id Software's 1999 first-person shooter (FPS) video game Quake III Arena. Featured during the launch of the website machinima.com, the work was initially controversial among machining filmmakers because it was created and distributed in a conventional video file format, whereas previous machinima films were demo files that required the original game to view. However, the more accessible format broadened Quad Gods viewership, and, in a few years, the use of conventional video formats became nearly universal for machinima.

Notes

References

Further reading

2000 animated films
2000 films
Machinima based on a Quake series engine
2000s English-language films